Nemanja Stanković (born 8 August 1997) is a Serbian football midfielder who plays for RFK Novi Sad.

Career
In April 2018, Stanković joined Croatian club NK Sesvete. In February 2019, he joined RFK Novi Sad.

References

External links
 
 Nemanja Stanković stats at utakmica.rs 
 
 

1997 births
Living people
Footballers from Novi Sad
Association football midfielders
Serbian footballers
FK Donji Srem players
FK Borac Čačak players
MŠK Žilina players
Serbian SuperLiga players
Serbian First League players
Serbian expatriate footballers
Serbian expatriate sportspeople in Slovakia
Expatriate footballers in Slovakia